Sena and Guttika were two Tamil horse traders thought to be from South India who killed and usurped the throne of the reigning Anuradhapura king Suratissa. They reigned for 22 years from 237 BC to 215 BC. Suratiss's nephew Asela defeated them and retook the Sinhalese throne.

See also
 List of monarchs of Sri Lanka

References

External links 
 Kings & Rulers of Sri Lanka
 Codrington's Short History of Ceylon

Monarchs of Anuradhapura
3rd-century BC Sinhalese monarchs
Duos
S